In the branch of mathematics called homological algebra, a t-structure is a way to axiomatize the properties of an abelian subcategory of a derived category.  A t-structure on  consists of two subcategories  of a triangulated category or stable infinity category which abstract the idea of complexes whose cohomology vanishes in positive, respectively negative, degrees.  There can be many distinct t-structures on the same category, and the interplay between these structures has implications for algebra and geometry.  The notion of a t-structure arose in the work of Beilinson, Bernstein, Deligne, and Gabber on perverse sheaves.

Definition
Fix a triangulated category  with translation functor .
In particular, they are stable under finite direct sums.

More briefly, we define

With this notation, the axioms above may be rewritten as:

The heart of a t-structure is an abelian category (whereas a triangulated category is additive but almost never abelian), and it is stable under extensions.

A triangulated category with a choice of t-structure is sometimes called a t-category.

Variations
Some authors define a t-structure to be the pair .

The two subcategories  and  determine each other. That is,  are left and right orthogonal complements of each other. Moreover, because these subcategories are full by definition, it is enough to specify their objects.

The above notation is adapted to the study of cohomology. When the goal is to study homology, slightly different notation is used.

If we define

then the axioms for a homological t-structure may be written explicitly as

Examples
The natural t-structure
The most fundamental example of a t-structure is the natural t-structure on a derived category.  Let  be an abelian category, and let  be its derived category.  Then the natural t-structure is defined by the pair of subcategories

It follows immediately that

In this case, the third axiom for a t-structure, the existence of a certain distinguished triangle, can be made explicit as follows. Define

It is clear that  and that there is a short exact sequence of complexes

This exact sequence furnishes the required distinguished triangle.

This example can be generalized to exact categories (in the sense of Quillen). There are also similar t-structures for the bounded, bounded above, and bounded below derived categories.

Perverse sheaves
The category of perverse sheaves is, by definition, the core of the so-called perverse t-structure on the derived category of the category of sheaves on a complex analytic space X or (working with l-adic sheaves) an algebraic variety over a finite field. As was explained above, the heart of the standard t-structure simply contains ordinary sheaves, regarded as complexes concentrated in degree 0. For example, the category of perverse sheaves on a (possibly singular) algebraic curve X (or analogously a possibly singular surface) is designed so that it contains, in particular, objects of the form

This shift causes the category of perverse sheaves to be well-behaved on singular spaces. The simple objects in this category are the intersection cohomology sheaves of subvarieties with coefficients in an irreducible local system.
This t-structure was introduced by Beilinson, Bernstein and Deligne. It was shown by Beilinson that the derived category of the heart  is in fact equivalent to the original derived category of sheaves. This is an example of the general fact that a triangulated category may be endowed with several distinct t-structures.

Graded modules
A non-standard example of a t-structure on the derived category of (graded) modules over a graded ring has the property that its heart consists of complexes

where  is a module generated by its (graded) degree n. This t-structure called geometric t-structure plays a prominent role in Koszul duality.

Spectra
The category of spectra is endowed with a t-structure generated, in the sense above, by a single object, namely the sphere spectrum. The category  is the category of connective spectra, i.e., those whose negative homotopy groups vanish. (In areas related to homotopy theory, it is common to use homological conventions, as opposed to cohomological ones, so in this case it is common to replace "" (superscript) by "" (subscript). Using this convention, the category of connective spectra the notation is denoted .)

Motives
A conjectural example in the theory of motives is the so-called motivic t-structure. Its (conjectural) existence is closely related to certain standard conjectures on algebraic cycles and vanishing conjectures, such as the Beilinson-Soulé conjecture.

Truncation functors
In the above example of the natural t-structure on  the derived category of an abelian category, the distinguished triangle guaranteed by the third axiom was constructed by truncation. Using this, it can be shown that there are truncation functors on the derived category and that they induce a natural distinguished triangle.

In fact, this is an example of a general phenomenon.  While the axioms for a t-structure do not assume the existence of truncation functors, such functors can always be constructed and are essentially unique.  Suppose that  is a triangulated category and that  is a t-structure.  The precise statement is that the inclusion functors

admit adjoints.  These are functors

such that
 

such that d and the counit and unit of the adjunctions together define a distinguished triangle

The existence of  implies the existence of the other truncation functors by shifting and taking opposite categories. For each , fix one such triangle and define .

with the isomorphism being induced by the morphism . This exhibits  as a solution to a certain universal mapping problem. Standard results on adjoint functors now imply that  is unique up to unique isomorphism and that there is a unique way to define  on morphisms that makes it a right adjoint.

Repeated truncation for a t-structure behaves similarly to repeated truncation for complexes.  If , then there are natural transformations

which yield natural equivalences

Cohomology functors
The nth cohomology functor  is defined as

As the name suggests, this is a cohomological functor in the usual sense for a triangulated category.  That is, for any distinguished triangle , we obtain a long exact sequence

The cohomology functors take values in the heart . By one of the repeated truncation identities above, up to natural equivalence it is equivalent to define

For the natural t-structure on a derived category , the cohomology functor  is, up to quasi-isomorphism, the usual nth cohomology group of a complex.  However, considered as functors on complexes, this is not true.  Consider, for example,  as defined in terms of the natural t-structure.  By definition, this is

A t-structure is non-degenerate if the intersection of all , as well as the intersection of all , consists only of zero objects. For a non-degenerate t-structure, the collection of functors  is conservative.

Exact functors
For , let  be a triangulated category with a fixed t-structure .  Suppose that  is an exact functor (in the usual sense for triangulated categories, that is, up to a natural equivalence it commutes with translation and preserves distinguished triangles).  Then  is:
 Left t-exact if ,
 Right t-exact if , and
 t-exact if it is both left and right t-exact.

It is also elementary to see that if  is another left (resp. right) t-exact functor, then the composite  is also left (resp. right) t-exact.

The motivation for the study of one-sided t-exactness properties is that they lead to one-sided exactness properties on hearts.  Let  be the inclusion.  Then there is a composite functor

It can be shown that if  is left (resp. right) exact, then  is also left (resp. right) exact, and that if  is also left (resp. right) exact, then .

Constructions of t-structures

Let  be a triangulated subcategory of a triangulated category .

is a t-structure on  if and only if  is stable under the truncation functor . When this condition holds, the t-structure  is called the induced t-structure.

To construct the category of perverse sheaves, it is important to be able to define a t-structure on a category of sheaves over a space by working locally in that space.  The precise conditions necessary for this to be possible can be abstracted somewhat to the following setup.  Suppose that there are three triangulated categories and two morphisms

satisfying the following properties.

This works, in particular, when the sheaves in question are left modules over a sheaf of rings  on X and when the sheaves are ℓ-adic sheaves.

can be shown to be a t-structure.

On stable ∞-categories
The elementary theory of t-structures carries over to the case of ∞-categories with few changes. Let  be a stable ∞-category. A t-structure on an ∞-category can be notated either homologically or cohomologically, just as in the case of a triangulated category.

Define

to be the inclusion functors.  Just as in the case of a triangulated category, these admit a right and a left adjoint, respectively, the truncation functors

These functors satisfy the same repeated truncation identities as in the triangulated category case.

The category  is equivalent to the nerve of its homotopy category . The cohomology functor  is defined to be , or equivalently .

The existence of  means that  is, by definition, a localization functor. These are localization functors L whose essential image is closed under extension, meaning that if  is a fiber sequence with X and Z in the essential image of L, then Y is also in the essential image of L.  Given such a localization functor L, the corresponding t-structure is defined by

t-localization functors can also be characterized in terms of the morphisms f for which Lf is an equivalence. If  is a localization functor, then the set S of all morphisms f for which Lf is an equivalence is quasisaturated. Then L is a t-localization functor if and only if S is the smallest quasisaturated set of morphisms containing all morphisms .

The derived category of an abelian category has several subcategories corresponding to different boundedness conditions.  A t-structure on a stable ∞-category can be used to construct similar subcategories.  Specifically,

One says that  is left bounded (with respect to the given t-structure) if , right bounded if , and bounded if .

It is also possible to form a left or right completion with respect to a t-structure. This is analogous to formally adjoining directed limits or directed colimits.

The right completion is defined dually. The left and right completions are themselves stable ∞-categories which inherit a canonical t-structure. We say that  is left complete or right complete if the canonical map to its left or right completion, respectively, is an equivalence.

Related concepts
If the requirement ,  is replaced by the opposite inclusion
, 
and the other two axioms kept the same, the resulting notion is called a co-t-structure or weight structure.

References

Homological algebra
Category theory